An articulated hauler, articulated dump truck (ADT), or sometimes a dump hauler, is a very large heavy-duty type of dump truck used to transport loads over rough terrain, and occasionally on public roads. The vehicle usually has all-wheel drive and consists of two basic units: the front section, generally called the tractor, and the rear section that contains the dump body, called the hauler or trailer section. Steering is made by pivoting the front in relation to the back by hydraulic rams. This way, all wheels follow the same path, making it an excellent off-road vehicle.

Manufacturers include Volvo CE, Caterpillar, Terex, John Deere/Bell Equipment, Moxy/Doosan,  Astra and Komatsu Limited. With half of the global sales, Volvo is the market leader in the segment, and is also the prime pioneer of the vehicle, enabling its introduction to the markets in 1966.

Although first envisioned as a soil and aggregate transporter (dumper), the chassis have since been used for many other applications include agriculture, mining, construction and highway maintenance. Ranging from concrete mixer, water tanker and container truck, over to upsize off-road semi-trailer hauler (on-road applications), hook loader or crane, as well as used to transport timber and as a woodchipper platform. Its chassis have also been used for military purposes given that it only is surpassed by tracked vehicles in off-road capabilities. An example is the Archer Artillery System.

History

In 1955 the Swedish company tractor trailer manufacturer Lihnells Vagn AB (Livab) started to develop a specialized dump vehicle in cooperation with Bolinder-Munktell (BM), which in 1950 had been bought by Volvo but still operated as an independent daughter company. This was essentially a trailer with a powered axle mated to an agricultural tractor and utilizing its power take-off shaft to drive the trailer's axle. These were not articulated haulers in the modern sense, as the tractor retained its front axle to provide steering.

As Livab's cooperation with BM deepened, it started experimenting with getting rid of the front axle by permanently attaching the trailer and instead provide steering through hydraulic cylinders forcing the trailer and wagon to turn in relation to each other. This was made in analogue with systems already developed for use in tandem tractors (see for example Doe Triple-D). The first purpose-built articulated hauler was DR 631, a 4x4, released in 1966, with a larger 6x6 model DR 860 being released in 1968. In 1974 Livab was absorbed into Volvo BM.

Meanwhile, a very similar vehicle was developed by another Swedish company, Kockum Landsverk AB. Having a similar tractor derived design it released its first articulated 4x4 dumper truck in 1967 named KL 411 that was replaced by a similar sized 6x6 in 1973 named KL 412. This company competed with Volvo BM until 1982 when it was bought by its bigger competitor.

The early articulated haulers were rugged, lacked suspension and had manual transmissions. This made them uncomfortable, noisy and demanding to drive and contributed to operator fatigue. The lack of suspension, other than that inherent in the large tires, also put stress on the drive-train and chassis, making them unsuitable for high-speed operation and in need of frequent service. The top speed was a mere 30 km/h. Many of these concerns have been eliminated with development over the years. The driver situation was addressed with the introduction of front suspension in the Volvo BM 5350 of 1979. This model also saw the introduction of automatic transmission and instead of a tractor derived cab, a new purpose designed cab.

LeTourneau and Athey ADTs
From NZ Contractor magazine· One of RG LeTourneau’s many design innovations was the ADT.. The first ADT, the Tournatailer, built in 1938 and was based on a Model A Tournapull, Then came the 1940 Model C Tournapull. LeTourneau Australia meanwhile built a scow-shaped dumper body for use behind the Australian Tournapull, and this was to become the Tournarocker. Following the war, LeTourneau set about designing tougher articulated rear dumpers which he christened “Tournarockers”.

In around 1950 the Athey company introduced their two axle AT-15 Articulated Hauler.

Since there have been developments in brakes, differentials and other aspects of the drive-train to increase speed, usability and reliability. Full suspension (meaning all three live axles now are fitted with suspension) came with the 2007 Volvo CE A35E/A40E. Volvo trucks allow each of the three solid axles to move and twist independent of the other two, and therefore calls it "independent suspension" in their marketing materials, although it still utilizes solid axles, unlike independent suspension in automobiles. Others have since followed suit.

Design

Retained features from its agricultural tractor heritage is the operators location and the basic layout. The driver thus sit behind the engine and above the transmission and front drive axle. The permanently attached trailer can not move vertically in relation to the tractor, but can rotate and swing on the horizontal plane. The operator have a conventional steering wheel that actuates hydraulic cylinders that push and pull the tractor relative to the trailer. The tractor and the trailer sections can move at great angles to each other making for a small turning radius.

The trailer axle(s) are driven by a drive shaft exiting the rear of the transmission with splines and universal joints to accommodate the movement between them. All axles are portals with hub reduction and locking differentials. Initially the axle differentials were permanently locked but recently some models can run with open but lockable differentials for better high-speed capabilities. The usual twin back axles are combined in a separate frame that can pivot in relation to the "trailer" frame, keeping all wheels on the ground, but until recently always unsprung (called a "bogie"). Likewise the less-common trucks with single rear axles usually are unsprung in the rear, while the front axle have suspension to give the operator a better ride. The reinforced cab is sometimes also sprung, as is done in modern cab-over-engine trucks, as is the drivers seat.

The way the sections can twist in relation to each other and the way the vehicle steers, making the back tires follow the same path as the front tires, provide for excellent off-road capabilities in combination with all-wheel drive. The top speed is limited at 55–60 km/h (the ungoverned Archer Artillery System has a maximum road speed of "at least 70 km/h"; however this would be at expense of fuel economy and mechanical wear, and would exceed the standard speed of military convoys significantly) and the net loading capacity is ranging from just below 25 to a little over 40 tonnes.

Applications

The front section of an articulated hauler can be adapted to many uses to include water tankers,

Comparison to rigid dump trucks

Articulated haulers excel in hauling material over rough terrain e.g. swamps, bogs, marshes. They are rugged and are built to handle great inclines and slippery conditions. This is their main advantage over  rigid haulers, which excel in carrying capacity. Where an articulated hauler can take no more than 55 metric tonnes there are models of rigid haulers (haulers with conventional front steering and rear-wheel drive) that can carry up to 310 tonnes such as the Belaz 7550. The model 7550, produced for five years, was actually a prototype while the EH 5000, has a payload capacity of 326 tonnes, which is one tonne shy of the Komatsu 960E-1.

This is also seen in the way they are used. Whereas rigid haulers find their best usage at large surface mines and big quarries, where there is abundant space and hard level surfaces to drive on, articulated haulers are best used at rugged and cramped sites, such as large construction sites.

The articulated haulers relatively small size also make them able to drive on public roads between different worksites at a large construction project—something that is impossible for the largest haul trucks, which might even have to be disassembled to be moved between different locations. For transportation between different construction projects, articulated haulers usually have to be hauled on flatbed trailers as oversize cargo due to their width and weight, as well as their limited speed. However, in reality, it is normal for most articulated trucks to be trailered between worksites, as there are few construction sites giving an opportunity to drive on public roads between work zones, depending on the size of the machine (chassis, wheels, etc.) and the local laws this could also be illegal. For any distance greater than a few miles, it would also be considered uneconomical wear-and-tear on the hauler trucks, to be putting hours on them that aren't contributing towards the paying job. It is far more efficient and quicker to use trucks and trailers and let them do what they specialize in, over-road hauling.

See also
Volvo Construction Equipment
Dump truck
Doosan Infracore (formerly Daewoo Heavy Industries & Machinery) - including Solar brand
Gama Goat
Archer Artillery System

References

External links
Information at theconstructionmachinery.com

Volvo Group
Dump trucks
Mining equipment

nn:Dumpar#Rammestyrte dumparar